Yonaguni Knoll IV is a seamount in the Okinawa Trough, east of Taiwan. It lies at about  depth and formed through Quaternary volcanism that yielded dacitic and rhyolitic magmas. The seamount is hydrothermally active, with numerous sites that are colonized by mussels and other marine animals. A submarine underground "lake" of liquid carbon dioxide has been identified at Yonaguni Knoll IV.

Geology and geomorphology 

Yonaguni Knoll IV (also known as Daiyon-Yonaguni) lies in the southern Okinawa Trough, between Taiwan and Ishigaki Island and northwest of Yonaguni Island. It is a rift presumably linked to back-arc seafloor spreading behind the Ryukyu Trench, where the Philippine Plate subducts beneath the Eurasia Plate. Numerous submarine volcanoes and at least 15 hydrothermal systems are known from the trough, where conditions are favourable for hydrothermal activity and which began to open in the Miocene.

Volcanic rocks from Yonaguni Knoll IV define a calc-alkaline suite of dacite and rhyolite. It tilts to the southeast,  and may represent a geological fault at about  depth.

Yonaguni Knoll IV lies at the southwestern end of a northeast-southwest trending chain of volcanic seamounts in the southern Okinawa Trough, and may be a product of the subduction of the Gagua submarine ridge, which commenced in the early Pleistocene and generated a slab window under the Okinawa Trough. There are more than 70 volcanoes in this chain. These volcanoes were active during the Quaternary and erupted dacites and rhyolites. The magma formed through the fractional crystallization mixing of basalt from the mantle and felsic magmas from the crust.

Hydrothermal venting 

Hydrothermal venting at the knoll was discovered in 2000 by the  submersible, and the venting of liquid  by the same submersible three years later. Liquid  was observed venting from the JADE hydrothermal site also in the Okinawa Trough in 1989. 

Multiple separate hydrothermal vent sites occur in the valley southwest of Yonaguni Knoll IV; from north to south these are the Lion, Crystal, Tiger, Swallow, Abyss, Carp and Mosquito sites. The first two and the fourth form a group, and Tiger appears to be the main site. The individual vents have diverse venting styles and produce different hydrothermal fluids. They feature both vents classified as black smokers and as white smokers. Radiometric dating of some vents has indicated ages of a couple of centuries, with one approaching 1000 years.

Liquid carbon dioxide  

The liquid  is vented from areas between the Tiger and Swallow vents and at the Crystal site. Given that at such depths  is less dense than water, it may be trapped under a layer of  hydrate beneath the sediment layers.

Origin of the hydrothermal fluids 

An intense hydrothermal system must exist there to power the various seafloor surface manifestations. Based on heat flow analysis, it appears that the water in the hydrothermal system recharges north of Yonaguni Knoll and emerges on it. Rhyolitic magmas are then leached, thus yielding the mineral content of the hydrothermal vent fluids. The total power output amounts to about 540 megawatt.

The hydrothermal fluids are partitioned underground into separate brine-rich, vapour-rich and residual fluids which rise to the surface and give rise to numerous separate vents. Hydrothermal plumes rise from above the vent sites and the seawater above Yonaguni has unusually high methane concentrations.

Hydrothermal deposits 

Red and yellow sulfur deposits which also contain arsenic are found around the Tiger vent, while hydrothermal crusts cover the seafloor around the Abyss vent. These are deposits of sulfates and sulfides, some of them formed by the collapse of old black smokers. Numerous minerals of elements such as arsenic, barium, copper, iron, lead, manganese and zinc form five different assemblages of mineralization. The assemblages appear to correlate with modes of sulfide/sulfate mineralization. Inversely, silicate and carbonate weathering occurs on pre-existent rocks. The age of the vent deposits reaches 11,000 years.

Life 

Hydrothermal communities occur at Yonaguni Knoll IV, with dense assemblages of vent animals at the "Crystal" site and polychaete groups with Sulfurospirillum. The dominant animals in the area are echinoderms including holothurians and starfish, with crabs and mussels found around the vents. Fish, octopuses, polychaetes in tubes, sea anemones and shrimps are also found. Fish, sea spiders, sponges and starfish settle on extinct vents.

Hydrothermal sediments at Yonaguni Knoll IV have diverse microbial communities, with over one billion cells per . Heterotrophic lineages have also been found. Microbial communities have also been sampled from hydrothermal plumes.

On the other hand, a diverse microbial ecosystem has been identified from the margins of the liquid  "lake".

Notes

References

Sources 

 
 
 
 
 
 
 
 
 
 
 

Hydrothermal vents
Volcanoes of the Pacific Ocean
Okinawa Islands